The Mistress can refer to:

Film and television 

 The Mistress (TV series), a British sitcom
 The Mistress (1927 film), a silent German film
 The Mistress (1962 film), a 1962 Swedish film
 The Mistress (2012 film), a 2012 Filipino film

Doctor Who characters 

 Missy (Doctor Who), a female incarnation of the Master character in Doctor Who
 The Mistress, a depiction of Romana II in a series of Doctor Who audioplays

Other uses 

 "The Mistress", a song by Charlotte Church from Two

See also
 Mistress (disambiguation)